This is a list of members of the South Australian House of Assembly from 1896 to 1899, as elected at the 1896 colonial election:

 Gumeracha NDL MHA Charles Willcox resigned on 18 June 1896 following concerns about his status as a government contractor. He was declared by the Court of Disputed Returns to have been incapable of being elected on 19 June. William Richard Randell, who Willcox had defeated at the 1896 election, won the resulting by-election on 10 July.
 Stanley MHA Peter Paul Gillen died on 22 September 1896. William Patrick Cummins won the resulting by-election on 17 October.
 North Adelaide NDL MHA Arthur Harrold resigned on 2 April 1897. NDL candidate Paddy Glynn won the resulting by-election on 22 May.
 Albert NDL MHA George Ash died on 23 February 1897. Archibald Peake won the resulting by-election on 22 May, but was unseated by the Court of Disputed Returns on 3 July following allegations of electoral irregularities in the booth at Holder. Peake won a second by-election on 31 July.
 North Adelaide MHA Richard Wood was expelled from the Labor Party in November 1897 and served out his term as an independent.
 East Adelaide Labor MHA John McPherson died on 13 December 1897. Labor candidate James Hutchison won the resulting by-election on 22 January 1898.
 Mount Barker MHA John Cockburn resigned on 20 April 1898. Charles Dumas won the resulting by-election on 14 May.

References

External links
History of South Australian elections 1857–2006, volume 1: ECSA

Members of South Australian parliaments by term
19th-century Australian politicians